Smile, It's the End of the World is the second full-length album by pop punk band Hawk Nelson. It was released on April 4, 2006.

The record was a 2007 GMA Dove Award nominee for Rock Album, produced by Aaron Sprinkle.  It was also a nominee for Recorded Music Packaging, designed by Jason Powers. It is also the longest album by the band. Smile, It's the End of the World charted at No. 75 on the Billboard 200 after selling more than 14,000 copies in its opening week. "The Show" is on the Digital Praise PC game Guitar Praise.

Track listing

A different version of "Bring 'Em Out", which features Drake Bell, was released on the band's 2005 EP of the same name and on the special edition of Hawk Nelson Is My Friend. The version with Bell was performed in the film Yours, Mine and Ours. The band's frontman, Jason Dunn, has said in an interview that there was going to be an actual title song, making the album have thirteen songs.

Personnel
Hawk Nelson
 Jason Dunn — vocals, piano
 Daniel Biro — bass, background vocals
 Jonathan Steingard — guitar, background vocals
 Aaron "Skwid" Tosti — drums

Additional personnel
 Everett Dallas, Kenneth E. Larry, James Young, Willie Williams — vocals on "The Show"
 Josh Head — vocals on "Nothing Left to Show"

Production

 Aaron Sprinkle – audio engineer, audio production, engineer, producer
 Trevor McNevan – audio production, composer, pre-production
 Aaron Lipinski – engineer, mixing assistant
 Randy Torres – engineer
 J.R. McNeely – mixing
 Brian Gardner — mastering
 Jonathan Dunn – A&R
 Brandon Ebel – executive producer
 Jason Powers – art direction, design, illustrations
 David Hill – photography

Singles
The band has released the song "Everything You Ever Wanted" on Christian radio. It peaked at No. 1 on the Christian Hit Radio format. "The Show" has appeared on Christian radio as well.

The band released a video and on the radio for "Zero" on May 30, 2007. It was the 15th most played song of 2007 on U.S. Christian Hit Radio stations.

Awards
In 2007, the album was nominated for a Dove Award for Rock Album of the Year at the 38th GMA Dove Awards.

References

External links
Vh1.com

2006 albums
Hawk Nelson albums
Tooth & Nail Records albums
Albums produced by Aaron Sprinkle